Selz is a census-designated place and unincorporated community in Pierce County, North Dakota, United States. Its population was 46 as of the 2010 census.

St. Boniface Cemetery, Wrought-Iron Cross Site, near Selz, is listed on the National Register of Historic Places.

Geography
Selz is located at  (47.857222, −99.891667).

Demographics

2010 census
As of the census of 2010, there were 46 people, 23 households, and 11 families in the CDP. The racial makeup of the CDP was 97.8% White, and 2.2% Asian.

There were 23 households, of which 21.7% had children under the age of 18 living with them, 34.8% were married couples living together, 4.3% had a female householder with no husband present, 8.7% had a male householder with no wife present, and 52.2% were non-families. 47.8% of all households were made up of individuals, and 17.4% had someone living alone who was 65 years of age or older. The average household size was 2.00 and the average family size was 3.00.

The median age in the CDP was 45.0 years. 21.7% of residents were under the age of 18; 4.3% were between the ages of 18 and 24; 23.9% were from 25 to 44; 32.6% were from 45 to 64; and 17.4% were 65 years of age or older. The gender makeup of the CDP was 54.3% male and 45.7% female.

See also
Selz, Ukraine

References

Census-designated places in Pierce County, North Dakota
Census-designated places in North Dakota
Unincorporated communities in North Dakota
Unincorporated communities in Pierce County, North Dakota
German-Russian culture in North Dakota